Tiwana or Tiwana is a Jatt clan from the Punjab region of India and Pakistan. The Tiwanas in East Punjab are mostly Sikhs, while the Tiwanas of West Punjab are almost all Muslims.

Notable people with this surname include:
 Malik Khuda Buksh Tiwana, Member of National Assembly of Pakistan from Khushab District
 Dalip Kaur Tiwana (born 1935), Indian writer
 Harpal Tiwana (born 1935), Indian playwright
 Malik Fateh Khan Tiwana (died 1848), Punjabi landowner and politician during the Sikh Empire
 Malik Khizar Hayat Tiwana (1900 – 1975), Pakistani Muslim military officer and politician
 Justice CS Tiwana (born 1921), legendary judge of the Punjab and Haryana High Court, author Tiwana Commission Report which exposed police torture in Indian Punjab in the 1980s.
 Hardeep Singh Tiwana (born 1960), Indian hotelier and philanthropist.
 Sukhvir Singh Tiwana (born 1965), Indian advocate

See also
 Hassanpur Tiwana, the Union Council of the Khushab District of Punjab in Pakistan
 Mitha Tiwana, a municipal committee in the Khushab District of Punjab in Pakistan

References

Jat clans of Punjab
Punjabi-language surnames
Indian names
Pakistani names
Punjabi tribes